Dociostaurus genei is a species of slant-faced grasshopper in the family Acrididae. It is found in southern Europe and the Middle East.

Subspecies
These subspecies belong to the species Dociostaurus genei:
 Dociostaurus genei genei (Ocskay, 1832)
 Dociostaurus genei littoralis Soltani, 1978

References

External links

 

Gomphocerinae